Kabul District is a district of Kabul Province, Afghanistan. The seat lies at Kabul.

References 
AIMS District Map
Census Data

Districts of Kabul Province